Kagadi General Hospital is a hospital in the Western Region of Uganda.

Location

The geographical coordinates of Kagadi General Hospital are 0°56'30.0"N, 30°48'32.0"E (Latitude:0.941661; Longitude:30.808889).

Overview
Kagadi General Hospital was built and is owned by the government of Uganda. In July 2012, the hospital experienced an outbreak of Ebola Hemorrhagic Fever. Like many hospitals in Uganda, the hospital faces challenges of understaffing, poor pay, and late salary payments.

See also
List of hospitals in Uganda

References

External links
 Website of Uganda Ministry of Health
 Kagadi General Hospital On 4 August 2012

Hospitals in Uganda
Kagadi District
Bunyoro sub-region
Western Region, Uganda